Kerosene Salesman's Wife is a 1988 Soviet drama film directed by Alexander Kaidanovsky.

Plot 
The film tells about two brother doctors, one of whom operated on a boy, and the other assisted him. A blood transfusion was necessary and the surgeon poured the boy blood of the wrong group, as a result of which the boy died, and the brothers' life changed. The first became a kerosene salesman, the second - the chairman of the City Council.

Cast 
 Vytautas Paukste
 Aleksandr Baluev
 Anna Myasoyedova
 Sergey Veksler
 Evgeniy Mironov

References

External links 
 

1988 films
1980s Russian-language films
Soviet drama films
1988 drama films